Walter Frank Rittman (December 2, 1883 - September 26, 1954) was a chemical engineer with the United States Bureau of Mines.

Biography
He was born in Sandusky, Ohio on December 2, 1883 to Louisa and Christ Rittman. He attended Sandusky High School then Ohio Northern University. He received a master's degree from Swarthmore College in 1909 and his Ph.D. from Columbia University. In 1915 he invented a process which increased the amount of gasoline distilled from crude oil. He died on September 26, 1954 in Pittsburgh, Pennsylvania.

References

1883 births
1954 deaths
People from Sandusky, Ohio
United States Bureau of Mines personnel
American chemical engineers
Ohio Northern University alumni
Swarthmore College alumni
Columbia University alumni